Artemisia palmeri is a rare species of sagebrush known by the common names San Diego sagewort and Palmer sagewort.

Distribution
The plant is native to northwestern Baja California and southwestern California, primarily in San Diego County.

Its natural habitat is sandy coastal ravines in the coastal sage scrub plant community and riparian riverbeds in the Cuyamaca Mountains and other Peninsular Ranges, below  in elevation.  Most of this habitat has been destroyed as the land has been developed for human uses. It is occasionally found farther inland in chaparral plant communities near Redlands and in the San Emigdio Mountains.

It is listed on the California Native Plant Society Inventory of Rare and Endangered Plants as an endangered species, due to the threat of further habitat loss.

Description
The base is woody.

The gray-green aromatic foliage is made up of long, narrow leaves deeply cut into several narrow, pointed lobes.

The inflorescence contains clusters of flower heads containing pale yellow glandular disc florets. It blooms generally from June to October.

The fruit is a tiny achene about a millimeter long.

References

External links
 Calflora Database: Artemisia palmeri (San diego sagewort)
Jepson Manual eFlora (TJM2) treatment of Artemisia palmeri

palmeri
Flora of Baja California
Flora of California
Natural history of the California chaparral and woodlands
Natural history of the Peninsular Ranges
Natural history of San Diego County, California
Plants described in 1876
Flora without expected TNC conservation status